Flask is a British unit of mass or weight in the avoirdupois system, used to measure mercury.

Conversion 
1 flask (mercury) ≡ 76 lb

1 flask (mercury) ≡ 34.47302012 kg

References

Units of mass
Customary units of measurement
Standards of the United Kingdom